An acidic oxide is an oxide that either produces an acidic solution upon addition to water, or acts as an acceptor of hydroxide ions effectively functioning as a Lewis acid. Acidic oxides will typically have a low pKa and may be inorganic or organic. A commonly encountered acidic oxide, carbon dioxide produces an acidic solution (and the generation of carbonic acid) when dissolved.

The acidity of an oxide can be reasonably assumed by its accompanying constituents. Less electronegative elements tend to form basic oxides such as sodium oxide and magnesium oxide, whereas more electronegative elements tend to produce acidic oxides as seen with carbon dioxide and phosphorus pentoxide. Some oxides like aluminium oxides are amphoteric.

Acidic oxides are of environmental concern. Sulfur and nitrogen oxides are considered air pollutants as they react with atmospheric water vapour to produce acid rain.

Examples 

Carbonic acid is an illustrative example of the Lewis acidity of an acidic oxide.
CO2 + 2OH−  HCO3− + OH−  CO32− + H2O
This property is a key reason for keeping alkali chemicals well sealed from the atmosphere, as long-term exposure to carbon dioxide in the air can degrade the material. 

Carbon dioxide is also the anhydride of carbonic acid:
H2CO3 -> H2O + CO2
Chromium trioxide, which reacts with water forming chromic acid
Dinitrogen pentoxide, which reacts with water forming nitric acid
Manganese heptoxide, which reacts with water forming permanganic acid

Further examples

Aluminium oxide
Aluminium oxide (Al2O3) is an amphoteric oxide; it can act as a base or acid. For example, with base different aluminate salts will be formed:
Al2O3 + 2 NaOH + 3 H2O → 2 NaAl(OH)4

Silicon dioxide
Silicon dioxide is an acidic oxide. It will react with strong bases to form silicate salts.

Silicon dioxide is the anhydride of silicic acid: 
Si(OH)4 -> 2H2O + SiO2

Phosphorus oxides
Phosphorus(III) oxide reacts to form phosphorous acid in water:
P4O6 + 6 H2O → 4 H3PO3

Phosphorus(V) oxide reacts with water to give phosphoric (v) acid:
P4O10 + 6 H2O → 4 H3PO4

Phosphorus trioxide is the anhydride of phosphorous acid:
2H3PO3 -> 3H2O + P2O3

Phosphorus pentoxide is the anhydride of phosphoric acid:
2H3PO4 -> 3H2O + P2O5

Sulfur oxides
Sulfur dioxide reacts with water to form the weak acid, sulfurous acid:
SO2 + H2O → H2SO3

Sulfur trioxide forms the strong acid sulfuric acid with water:
SO3 + H2O → H2SO4
This reaction is important in the manufacturing of sulfuric acid.

Chlorine oxides
Chlorine(I) oxide reacts with water to form hypochlorous acid, a very weak acid:
Cl2O + H2O <=> 2 HOCl
Chlorine(VII) oxide reacts with water to form perchloric acid, a strong acid:
Cl2O7 + H2O → 2 HClO4

Iron oxides
Iron(II) oxide is the anhydride of the aqueous ferrous ion:
[Fe(H2O)6]^2+ -> FeO + 2H+ + 5H2O

Chromium oxides
Chromium trioxide is the anhydride of chromic acid:
H2CrO4 -> H2O + CrO3

Vanadium oxides
Vanadium trioxide is the anhydride of vanadous acid:
2H3VO3 -> 3H2O + V2O3
Vanadium pentoxide is the anhydride of vanadic acid:
2H3VO4 -> 3H2O + V2O5

See also
Organic acid anhydride, similar  compounds in organic chemistry
Base anhydride

References